Augustaburiania is an extinct genus of tanystropheid archosauromorph from the latest Early Triassic (late Olenekian stage) of Volgograd Region, western Russia. All specimens were recovered in the right slope of the Don River valley from the Lipovskaya Formation. It was named by Sennikov in 2011 and the type species is Augustaburiania vatagini. Augustaburiania is the oldest known tanystropheid.

References

Tanystropheids
Prehistoric reptile genera
Olenekian genera
Early Triassic reptiles of Europe
Triassic Russia
Fossils of Russia
Fossil taxa described in 2011